The 198th (Canadian Buffs) Battalion, CEF was a unit in the Canadian Expeditionary Force during the First World War. Based in Toronto, Ontario, the unit began recruiting during the winter of 1915/16 from The Queen's Own Rifles of Canada, which was based in that city. After sailing to England in March 1917, the battalion was absorbed into the 3rd Reserve Battalion on March 9, 1918.  The 198th (Canadian Buffs) Battalion, CEF had one Officer Commanding: Lieut-Col. J. A. Cooper.

References
Meek, John F. Over the Top! The Canadian Infantry in the First World War. Orangeville, Ont.: The Author, 1971.

Battalions of the Canadian Expeditionary Force
Military units and formations established in 1916
Military units and formations disestablished in 1918
Queen's Own Rifles of Canada
1916 establishments in Ontario